The 2013 CFU Club Championship was the 15th edition of CFU Club Championship, the annual international club football competition in the Caribbean region, held amongst clubs whose football associations are affiliated with the Caribbean Football Union (CFU). The top three teams in the tournament qualified for the 2013–14 CONCACAF Champions League.

Participating teams
A total of seven teams from five CFU associations took part in the competition.

Baltimore (Haiti) was supposed to take part and was drawn into Group 1, but withdrew before the competition started.
Inter Moengotapoe (Suriname) was supposed to take part and was drawn into Group 2, but withdrew before the competition started. Portmore United (Jamaica) took their spot.

First round
The seven teams were divided into one group of three teams and one group of four teams. Each group was played on a round-robin basis at a centralized venue. The winners from each group qualified directly to the 2013–14 CONCACAF Champions League, while the runners-up advanced to the playoff round to determine the third entrant to the 2013–14 CONCACAF Champions League.

Group 1
Hosted by W Connection at Ato Boldon Stadium in Couva, Trinidad and Tobago (all times UTC−4).

Group 2
Hosted by Boys' Town at Anthony Spaulding Sports Complex in Kingston, Jamaica (all times UTC−5).

Playoff round
The playoff between the two group runners-up was played on two-legged basis, with both matches held in Trinidad and Tobago (all times UTC−4).

Caledonia AIA won 3–2 on aggregate and qualified for the 2013–14 CONCACAF Champions League.

Goalscorers

References

External links

CFU Club Championship
2013 CFU Competitions Report

2013
1
2013–14 CONCACAF Champions League